Nikolay Vasilyevich Pushkov (May 17, 1903 – January 29, 1981) was a Soviet scientist and founder of IZMIRAN.

Pushkov was born in Druzhno village, Dmitrovskiy uezd, Orlovskaya gubernia, Russian Empire.

He defended candidate's (Ph.D.) dissertation "Theory of Space Magnetism" in 1935 in Leningrad.

Scientific works 
 Theory of Space Magnetism (Thesis), 1934, 1935
 Upper layers of Earth Atmosphere and Earth Magnetism, published in Proc. of the Stratospheric Conference, 1935
 Newest Theories in Earth Magnetism, published in Meteorogical Bulletin, 1935
 Message on some works about Earth Magnetism and electricity in USSR for the 1931-1935 period, published in the Informational Digest over Earth Magnetism, 1936
 Statistical study of unexpected onset of magnetic storms, published in the Inf. Dig. over Earth Magn., 1936
 Comparison of magnetic activity with polar lights activity in Tihaya Bay , published in the Inf. Dig. over Earth Magn., 1937
 Radioforecasts User Manual (Руководство к пользованию радиопрогнозами), separate book, 1947
 Polar lights, published in the Issues of Academy of Sciences of USSR, 1958
 Observations of polar lights (instruction), published in the Issues of Academy of Sciences of USSR, 1957
 Studying Earth magnetic field on rockets and satellites, Uspekhi Fizicheskikh Nauk, 1957
 Preliminary report on geomagnetic studying on a Soviet artificial satellite, published in the Artificial Earth Satellites Digest ed. 2, 1958
 Results of Earth magnetic field studying on a space rockets, published in the Reports of Academy of Sciences of USSR, 1959
 Magnetic field studying on a second space rocket, published in the Artificial Earth Satellites Digest, 1960
 Magnetic field of the outer corpuscular region, published in the Proc. of the International conference on cosmic rays, 1960
 Assembly on International Quiet Sun Year, published in the Bulletin of Academy of Sciences of USSR, 1963
 Studying of the magnetic field in space, published in Space Research, 1963
 When the Sun is Quiet?, published in Aviation and Cosmonautics, 1965
 Attention! Sun is Quiet, published in Hydrometeoizdat, 1966 and by Mir Publishing House, 1968
 Main results of upper layers studying in Antarctic, published in the Main results of 10-year study of Antarctic, 1967.
 Resume of International Quiet Sun Year (London Assembly), published in the Bulletin of Academy of Sciences of USSR, 1967
 Sun influence on the Earth scene, published in the Bulletin of Academy of Sciences of USSR, 1968
 Studying of the magnetic fields of Earth and planets, published in the Progress of the USSR in the space explorations, 1968
 Leningrad symposium on Sun-Earth physics, published in the Earth and Universe, 1971
 Sun-Earth connections, published in the Geophysics Digest, 1971

 Source:  Typewriter IZMIRAN library cards on Pushkov's works (in Russian)

External links 
 "Making Waves: Stories from My Life" by Yakov Alpert, article in Physics Today
  Memorial centennial site of Nikolay Pushkov at IZMIRAN website

1903 births
1981 deaths
Soviet scientists